Harrison Arlington "Pete" Williams Jr. (December 10, 1919November 17, 2001) was an American politician and lawyer. He was a Democrat who represented New Jersey in the United States House of Representatives (1953–1957) and the United States Senate (1959–1982). Williams was convicted on May 1, 1981, for taking bribes in the Abscam sting operation, and resigned from the U.S. Senate in 1982 before a planned expulsion vote.

Life and career
Williams was born in Plainfield, New Jersey, the son of Isabel Lamson and Harrison Arlington Williams, and graduated from Oberlin College in 1941.  He engaged in newspaper work in Washington, D.C., and studied at the Edmund A. Walsh School of Foreign Service of Georgetown University until called to active duty as a seaman in the United States Naval Reserve in 1941. He became a naval aviator and was discharged as a lieutenant, junior grade, in 1945. After being employed in the steel industry for a short time, he graduated from Columbia Law School in 1948, and was admitted to the bar and commenced practice in New Hampshire. He returned to Plainfield in 1949 and continued to practice law, and was an unsuccessful candidate for the New Jersey General Assembly in 1951 and for city councilman in 1952.

Congressional service
Williams was elected to the House of Representatives in a special election in 1953, and was re-elected in 1954 but defeated for re-election in 1956. He was elected to the Senate in 1958 and re-elected in 1964, 1970 and 1976, defeating a future leader in the Republican Party, David A. Norcross.

He became the first Democratic senator in the history of New Jersey ever to be elected four times.  Known as "Pete," Williams fought for a range of social welfare laws and urban transit programs. He was instrumental in passage of such landmark laws as the Employee Retirement Income Security Act, which protects worker pensions, and the 1969 Coal Mine Safety and Health Act.

He also helped pass legislation that created the Occupational Safety and Health Administration and had a major role in passage of the Urban Mass Transportation Act of 1964, the first federal law to provide mass transportation assistance to states and cities. He also was the chairman of the United States Senate Special Committee on Aging from 1967 through 1971.

Williams was the sponsor of the 1968 Williams Act (named after him), which regulates tender offers.

Abscam conviction and resignation
In 1981, Williams, a resident of Westfield, New Jersey, at the time, was convicted of bribery and conspiracy in the Abscam scandal for taking bribes in a sting operation by the Federal Bureau of Investigation (FBI). The Senate Committee on Ethics recommended that Williams be expelled because of his "ethically repugnant" conduct. Prior to a Senate vote on his expulsion, Williams resigned on March 11, 1982. Sentenced to three years, he served two years in federal prison as Inmate #06089-050, the first time in over 80 years that a senator had spent time in prison. Williams was also fined $50,000. Released on January 31, 1986, he served the remainder of his sentence at a halfway house, where he later became a member of the board of directors until his death. He also attempted to receive a presidential pardon from President Bill Clinton, but his request was denied.

The Metropark train station had been renamed Harrison A. Williams Metropark Station in 1979, in recognition of his support for its construction.  However, the name was removed from the station after his conviction.

Williams died of cancer and heart ailments at St. Clare's Hospital in Denville, New Jersey, on November 17, 2001, at age 81. He was a resident of Bedminster Township, New Jersey.

See also
 List of American federal politicians convicted of crimes
 List of federal political scandals in the United States
 List of United States senators expelled or censured

References

External links
 
 

|-

|-

|-

|-

1919 births
2001 deaths
20th-century American Episcopalians
20th-century American lawyers
20th-century American politicians
Abscam
Columbia Law School alumni
Democratic Party members of the United States House of Representatives from New Jersey
Democratic Party United States senators from New Jersey
Military personnel from New Jersey
New Hampshire lawyers
New Jersey lawyers
New Jersey politicians convicted of crimes
Oberlin College alumni
People from Bedminster, New Jersey
People from Westfield, New Jersey
Politicians convicted of bribery under 18 U.S.C. § 201
Politicians convicted of conspiracy to defraud the United States
New Jersey politicians convicted of corruption
Politicians convicted of illegal gratuities under 18 U.S.C. § 201
Politicians convicted under the Travel Act
Politicians from Plainfield, New Jersey
United States Navy officers
United States Navy pilots of World War II
Prisoners and detainees of the United States federal government